The Floro PDW is a compact carbine that has been developed by the Floro International of the Philippines for conventional forces, as a replacement for their 9mm caliber sidearms and submachine guns.

Overview
The Floro PDW uses 5.56×45mm NATO ammunition and compatible with STANAG Magazines, improving ammunition compatibility requirements among troops while increasing their firepower effectiveness. The use of the Recoil Reduction System (RRS) enhances operator marksmanship and training. The Floro PDW can be fitted with an optional noise suppressor reduces the sound signature of the Floro PDW for Special Forces applications.

See also 

Knight's Armament Company PDW — Experimental personal defense weapon designed by Knight's Armament Company.
Magpul PDR — Compact bullpup carbine being developed by Magpul Industries.

References

compact carbines / subcarbines / too short carbines / compact assault rifles, personaldefenceweapons.com

5.56 mm assault rifles
Personal defense weapons
Weapons of the Philippines